This article lists the prime ministers of Haiti since the establishment of the office of Prime Minister of Haiti in 1988.

List
Political parties

Other factions

Symbols

Timeline

See also
 History of Haiti
 Saint-Domingue
 List of colonial governors of Saint-Domingue
 Politics of Haiti
 President of Haiti
 List of heads of state of Haiti
 Prime Minister of Haiti

Notes

References

Haiti
Prime ministers
Prime ministers